International Mr. Leather (IML) is an international, though largely American, conference and contest of leathermen held annually in May since 1979 in Chicago, Illinois.  Every year, the event corresponds to the weekend of the United States' Memorial Day holiday.

The International Mr. Leather conference is a multi-day and activity event to recognize International Mr. Leather. Shared interest events, such as speakers, socials, themed dance parties and a leather market are part of ways in which the competitors become known to the evaluating committee and enthusiasts, including the BDSM community, can share in the experience.

IML is an internationally recognized distinction with an informal relationship with how contestants qualify: contestants must either be a winner of a lower-level feeder competition of a bar, local or regional leather contest or be sponsored by a leather-related bar, business, club, or organization.

History
The forerunner of the competition was the 1970s "Mr. Gold Coast" bar contest held at Chicago's Gold Coast leather bar, owned by Chuck Renslow and his then-partner, Dom Orejudos. The "Mr. Gold Coast" contest became one of the bar's most popular promotions causing the need to locate the competition to a larger venue (in 1979), upon which the title was changed to International Mr. Leather.

In 1984 Ron Moore became the first black man to win International Mr. Leather. (Later, in 1997, his sister Genelle Moore won International Ms. Leather, which made them the first siblings to hold international leather titles.)

Competing in the 1986 International Mr. Leather contest inspired Steve Maidhof to organize a conference for members of the growing SM, leather, and fetish community, which would focus on education and political activism. To host this conference, named Living in Leather, Maidhof recruited several friends and leading members of Seattle's leather community including: Cookie Andrews-Hunt, Wayne Gloege, Billy Jefferson, Jan Lyon, George Nelson, and Vik Stump. Together, they formed the National Leather Association (NLA), which officially incorporated in the summer of 1986. In October, they hosted the first Living in Leather (LIL) conference.

The leather pride flag was designed by Tony DeBlase, and he first presented the design at the IML competition on May 28, 1989.

The International Mr. Bootblack (IMrBB) competition was added to the IML program in 1993. At its inception in 1993, the competition was properly titled the International Bootblack Competition, and both men and women were allowed to compete. In 1998, it was announced that the competition would be changed to the International Mr. Bootblack Competition and that a separate competition solely for women would be held at International Ms. Leather. This change was made largely because it was commonly held that women had a significant disadvantage competing for ballots from the mostly gay male IML attendees, who often base their bootblack selection at least partly on their sexual attraction to the bootblack. Since 1999, competitors for IMrBB are restricted to persons over the age of 21 who can provide a valid government-issued form of identification that identifies them as male.

In 1995, “Chuck Renslow – IML” was one of the recipients of the International Deaf Leather Recognition Award.

In 1999 IML received the Business of the Year award as part of the Pantheon of Leather Awards. 

In 2007 and 2012 IML received the Large Event of the Year award as part of the Pantheon of Leather Awards.

In May 2009 it was announced that IML proceeds would be placed in a trust to benefit the Leather Archives and Museum. The Leather Archives and Museum holds the records of the IML.

IML established in July 2009 the policy that IML Leather Market participation would exclude "any entity which promotes barebacking or distributes/sells any merchandise tending to promote or advocate barebacking."

In 2010 IML was inducted into the Chicago Gay and Lesbian Hall of Fame.

Also in 2010, Tyler McCormick became the first openly transgender man, the first wheelchair user, and the first person from New Mexico to win International Mr. Leather.

Starting in 2013, the International Mr. Bootblack (IMrBB) contest in the IML program has implemented a judging system to select the winner. Contestants are evaluated by a panel of judges on the basis of their technical bootblacking skills, how they present themselves on stage and in public and what they say in an interview with the judges. Ballot voting still makes up a percentage of the contestant's total score.

In 2018, IML was inducted into the Leather Hall of Fame during Cleveland Leather Annual Weekend 2018.

In 2019, Jack Thompson became the first openly transgender person of color to win International Mr. Leather. His win also made it the first time black men won consecutive International Mr. Leather titles.

As a result of the COVID-19 pandemic and the resultant shutdowns and cancellations of large gatherings throughout the world, in-person IML events in 2020 and 2021 were cancelled. IML returned in May 2022.

IML contest criteria
Preliminary round
Contest finalists are selected following:
A preliminary interview with each of the nine judges, up to 8 minutes in length, are held in private (60% of the preliminary score).
Stage presence and personality at a Saturday "Pecs and Personality" event (40% of the preliminary score).
The judge's highest and lowest scores for each contestant on each criterion are dropped, and the contestant's remaining seven scores are tallied to determine the 20 contestants with the highest combined scores to proceed as finalists at the Sunday IML contest event. The only time that the dropped scores are included in the tally is when there is a tie for the 20th place; the contestants in question have their dropped scores included in the tally but if the stalemate continues then each of the nine judges must vote for only one of the two contestants. Preliminary judging scores are not carried forward. There are also two tally masters.

Final round
Each of the 20 finalists is judged at the Sunday IML contest on a scale from 0 to 100 in the following order:
Leather image (up to 40 points).
Presentation skills that include a contestant speech (up to 40 points).
Physical appearance (up to 20 points).
The highest and lowest scores for each finalist are dropped, the remaining seven scores are added together, and the top three scores designate the second runner-up, first runner-up, and winner, International Mr. Leather. A tie for the title is resolved by adding to the tally the dropped scores of the two contestants; if the stalemate continues then each of the nine judges must vote for only one of the contestants in question.

IML contest winners
The following is a table of IML contest winners:

International Mr. Bootblack Competition
The International Mr. Bootblack (IMrBB) Competition runs throughout the IML weekend. Contestants are given a location in the IML Leather Market at which they perform bootblacking services. Weekend ticket package holders (as well as judges, contestants, and vendors) are each provided with a bootblack ballot which is redeemable for one shine by the bootblack of the voter's choice. Bootblacks are free to shine the boots of any person, regardless of whether that person has a ballot, although it is made clear that the ballots are the means by which the winner will be determined. Tipping is not required, but is quite common.

The bootblack contestants work during the Friday, Saturday, and Sunday of IML during the time that the Leather Market is open, a total of approximately 20 hours over three days. In previous years, the bootblacks were allowed to shine boots and collect tickets at all times during the weekend. Since 2001, the bootblack contestants have established a gentlemen's agreement at the start of the weekend that they will not shine boots or accept ballots except during the established competition hours. This agreement was conceived to give the contestants the freedom to take time to enjoy the weekend without feeling the pressure to always be bootblacking.

At its inception in 1993, the competition was properly titled the International Bootblack Competition, and both men and women were allowed to compete. In 1998, it was announced that the competition would be changed to the International Mr. Bootblack Competition and that a separate competition solely for women would be held at International Ms. Leather. This change was made largely because it was commonly held that women had a significant disadvantage competing for ballots from the mostly gay male IML attendees, who often base their bootblack selection at least partly on their sexual attraction to the bootblack. Since 1999, competitors for IMrBB are restricted to persons over the age of 21 who can provide a valid government-issued form of identification that identifies them as male.

The winner of the International Mr. Bootblack Competition is announced (along with the first and second runners-up and the winner of the Brotherhood Award, on which the IMrBB competitors vote and which is roughly analogous to the Miss Congeniality Award from various traditional beauty contests) at the Sunday contest, immediately following the announcement of the top 20 IML finalists.

In recent years, largely because of coordination of the contest by David Hawks, International Mr. Bootblack 2000, the Bootblack Competition has begun to develop adjunct activities. An IMrBB party is held in a hotel function room on Saturday night, offering food, music, and a silent auction, the proceeds of which go to the travel fund of the winner. Likewise, during the competition hours in the Leather Market, volunteers man a table to answer questions and sell IMrBB Travel Fund pins, which also adds to the travel fund. These sources of revenue have provided the various titleholders with significantly more money to aid their travel to distant events during their title years. The money is controlled by the contest coordinator, and any access to the funds must be accompanied by proof of the travel outlay.

Starting in 2013, the IMrBB contest has implemented a judging system to select the winner. Contestants are evaluated by a panel of judges on the basis of their technical bootblacking skills, how they present themselves on stage and in public and what they say in an interview with the judges. Ballot voting still makes up a percentage of the contestant's total score.

IMrBB contest winners
The following is a table of IMrBB contest winners:

See also

LGBT culture
Mister Leather Europe
National Leather Association International

Footnotes

Source for 1979 to 2003: 
Source for 2004 to 2008:

References

External links

IML Winners
International Mr. Leather 1996: Joe Gallagher 
International Mr. Leather 2003: John Pendal
International Mr. Leather 2004: Jason Hendrix
International Mr. Leather 2005: Michael Egdes
International Mr. Leather 2007: Mikel Gerle
International Mr. Leather 2008: Gary Iriza
International Mr. Leather 2009: Jeffrey Payne

LGBT events in Illinois
Fetish subculture
Leather events
Recurring events established in 1979
BDSM organizations
LGBT BDSM
LGBT beauty pageants
LGBT culture in Chicago
Gay male BDSM
1979 establishments in the United States
Annual events in Illinois